Njabulo Simakahle Ndebele (born 4 July 1948) is an  academic and  writer of fiction who is the former vice-chancellor and principal of the University of Cape Town (UCT). On November 16, 2012, he was inaugurated as the  chancellor of the  University of Johannesburg. He is currently the chairman of the Nelson Mandela Foundation.

Life and career 
Ndebele's father was Nimrod Njabulo Ndebele and his mother was Makhosazana Regina Tshabangu. He married Mpho Kathleen Malebo on 30 July 1971. They have one son and two daughters. Ndebele was awarded a Bachelor of Arts in English and philosophy by the University of Botswana, Lesotho, and Swaziland in 1973; a Master of Arts in English literature  by the University of Cambridge in 1975; and a Doctor of Philosophy in creative writing by the University of Denver in 1983.  He also studied at Churchill College, University of Cambridge, where he was the first recipient of the South African Bursary.

Njabulo Ndebele was vice-chancellor and principal at the University of Cape Town from July 2000 to June 2008, following tenure as a scholar in residence at the Ford Foundation’s headquarters in New York. He joined the foundation in September 1998, immediately after a five-year term of office as vice-chancellor and principal of the University of the North in Sovenga, in the then Northern Province. Previously he served as vice-rector of the University of the Western Cape.  Earlier positions include chair of the Department of African Literature at the University of the Witwatersrand; and pro-vice-chancellor, Dean, and head of the English department at the National University of Lesotho.

An established novelist, Ndebele published The Cry of Winnie Mandela in 2004 to critical acclaim.  An earlier publication Fools and Other Stories won the Noma Award, Africa's highest literary award for the best book published in Africa in 1984.  His highly influential essays on South African literature and culture were published in a collection Rediscovery of the Ordinary.

Ndebele served as president of the Congress of South African Writers for many years. As a public figure he is known for his incisive insights in commentaries on a range of public issues in South Africa.

Ndebele is also a key figure in South African higher education. He has served as chair of the South African Universities Vice-Chancellors Association from 2002 to 2005, and served on the executive board of the Association of African Universities since 2001.  He has done public service in South Africa in the areas of broadcasting policy, school curriculum in history, and more recently as chair of a government commission on the development and use of African languages as media of instruction in South African higher education. He served as president of the AAU from 2005 to 2009 and was chair of the Southern African Regional Universities Association. He is also a fellow of UCT.

He holds honorary doctorates from universities in the United Kingdom, Netherlands, Japan, South Africa and the United States. The University of Cambridge awarded him an honorary doctorate in law in 2006, and he was made an honorary fellow of Churchill College in 2007. In 2008 the University of Michigan awarded him another honorary doctorate in law.

Works 
 Fine Lines from the Box: Further Thoughts About Our Country, 2007
 The Cry of Winnie Mandela,  Ayebia Clarke Publishing, 2004
 "Africans must treasure their literature", The Independent, 30 July 2002
 Umpropheti/The Prophetess, 1999
 Death of a Son, 1996
 Bonolo and the Peach Tree, 1994
 Sarah, Rings, and I, 1993
 Rediscovery of the Ordinary: Essays on South African Literature and Culture, 1991, reissued 2006
 Fools and Other Stories, Ravan Press, 1983, reissued 2006

Njabulo Ndebele also contributed to Chimurenga magazine.

References

External links 
 Entry in Who's Who of Southern Africa

1947 births
Living people
People from Johannesburg
Academic staff of the University of Cape Town
Members of the Academy of Science of South Africa
South African male novelists
Academic staff of the National University of Lesotho
Alumni of Churchill College, Cambridge
Fellows of Churchill College, Cambridge
Academic staff of the University of the Western Cape
Academic staff of the University of Limpopo
Recipients of the Molteno medal
Vice-Chancellors of the University of Cape Town